Leni Fischer (18 July 1935 in Haltern, West Germany – 2 March 2022 in Rheine) was a German politician of the Christian Democratic Union (CDU) and former member of the German Bundestag.

Life 
Fischer was a member of the German Bundestag from 1976 to 1998. She had always entered parliament via the North Rhine-Westphalia state list. In the Bundestag she dealt mainly with foreign, defence and development policy issues.

References 

1935 births
2022 deaths
Members of the Bundestag for North Rhine-Westphalia
Members of the Bundestag 1994–1998
Members of the Bundestag 1990–1994
Members of the Bundestag 1987–1990
Members of the Bundestag 1983–1987
Members of the Bundestag 1980–1983
Members of the Bundestag 1976–1980
Female members of the Bundestag
20th-century German women politicians
Members of the Bundestag for the Christian Democratic Union of Germany